The 2009 Commodore Cup National Series was the 16th running of the Commodore Cup. It began on 26 April 2009, at Wakefield Park and ended on 29 November 2009, at Sandown Raceway. The series was won by Brett Holdsworth, who won three of the six rounds. The other rounds were won by Nick Parker and Jason Domaschenz, who shared the victory at Winton with his brother Craig.

Teams and drivers
The following drivers and teams competed in the 2009 Commodore Cup National Series.

Calendar
The 2009 Commodore Cup National Series consisted of six rounds.

Series standings

References
 National SoftwareCalendar: http://www.natsoft.com.au/cgi-bin/results.cgi?2009  Teams & drivers and round winners: http://www.natsoft.com.au/cgi-bin/results.cgi?26/04/2009.WAKEhttp://www.natsoft.com.au/cgi-bin/results.cgi?17/05/2009.PHILhttp://www.natsoft.com.au/cgi-bin/results.cgi?28/06/2009.WINhttp://www.natsoft.com.au/cgi-bin/results.cgi?19/07/2009.ARDChttp://www.natsoft.com.au/cgi-bin/results.cgi?30/08/2009.ORANhttp://www.natsoft.com.au/cgi-bin/results.cgi?29/11/2009.SAND

Commodore Cup
Commodore Cup